Skórka  is a village in the administrative district of Gmina Krajenka, within Złotów County, Greater Poland Voivodeship, in west-central Poland.

Before 1772 the area was part of Kingdom of Poland, 1772-1945 Prussia and Germany. For more on its history, see Złotów County. Between 1919 and 1939 it was close to the Polish–German border.

In 2005 the village had a population of 530.

References

External links 
  www.skorka-dawid.republika.pl 
  www.mlyn-skorka.pl

Villages in Złotów County